Luis Enrique Sam Colop or Sam-Colop (born in Cantel, 1955, died July 15, 2011) was a Guatemalan/Native American linguist,

lawyer, poet, writer, newspaper columnist, promoter of the K'iche' language, 
and social activist.

Early life

He was born in Cantel, Guatemala in 1955.

Education

Sam Colop graduated in Law at the Rafael Landivar University<ref>
    Alberto M. Fernández,
    [http://www.drclas.harvard.edu/revista/articles/view/499 Review of Kay B. Warren's Pan-Maya Activism in Guatemala] .
    ReVista online journal, Harvard (Spring 1999).
</ref>
and obtained his Ph.D. at SUNY, Buffalo in 1994 with a dissertation on Maya poetry.

Teaching career

He taught K'iche' Language at the Universidad de San Carlos, Guatemala. Starting in 1999 he was a Fulbright-sponsored visiting scholar at St. Mary's College of Maryland

Books and articles
Published works by Luis Sam-Colop include two poem collections, Versos sin refugio  and La copa y la raíz as well as various essays and articles.  He is best known outside Guatemala for a new edition of the Popol Vuh'' in the native language. 
He recently received a Guggenheim fellowship in connection with this work.

External links
 Ucha'xik - A growing collection of his newspaper columns in the Guatemalan newspaper Prensa Libre from 1996 to 2011.

References

Linguists from Guatemala
St. Mary's College of Maryland faculty
K'iche'
Guatemalan Maya people
People from Quetzaltenango Department
1955 births
2011 deaths
Guatemalan male writers
Rafael Landívar University alumni
University at Buffalo alumni
Academic staff of Universidad de San Carlos de Guatemala